Organ Pipe Cactus National Monument is a U.S. national monument and UNESCO biosphere reserve located in extreme southern Arizona that shares a border with the Mexican state of Sonora. The park is the only place in the United States where the senita and organ pipe cactus grow wild. Along with this species, many other types of cacti and other desert flora native to the Yuma Desert section of the Sonoran Desert region grow in the park. In 1976 the monument was declared a Biosphere Reserve by UNESCO, and in 1977 95% of Organ Pipe Cactus was declared a wilderness area.

Land for the Monument was donated by the Arizona state legislature to the federal government during Prohibition knowing that the north–south road would be improved and make contraband alcohol easier to import from Mexico. In 1937 the land was officially opened as a national monument.

At the north entrance of the park is the unincorporated community of Why, Arizona; the town of Lukeville, Arizona at the park's southern border is a border crossing point to Sonoyta, Sonora, Mexico.

Organ Pipe Cactus National Monument is bordered to the northwest by Cabeza Prieta National Wildlife Refuge and to the east by the Tohono O'odham Indian Reservation.

Mexico-United States barrier

The visitor center has been named in honor of Ranger Kris Eggle. On August 9, 2002, he was shot and killed by a drug smuggler during a United States Border Patrol operation. With a continuing, steady flow of immigrants and drug runners from Mexico, the majority of the park was closed in 2003. After being considered the most dangerous national park, the park reopened the backcountry after surveillance towers, vehicle barriers, and pedestrian fences were installed along the border.

The first  panels of a new Arizona, US-Mexico border wall were installed in August 2019 on a  stretch of Organ Pipe Cactus National Monument. It is the first of three projects that will add bollard walls along Southern Arizona's wildlife refuges. The National Park Service issued a report on September 18, 2019, stating that the barrier wall threatens archaeological artifacts representing 16,000 years of human history. The U.S. Customs and Border Protection agency said that five archaeological sites fall within the area that it wishes to construct.

In February 2020, controlled demolition and other construction work was performed within the Roosevelt Reservation. This strip of land along the border is federally controlled. However, many sites within this region are considered sacred by the Tohono O'odham Nation. Important sites include Monument Hill, which is a ceremonial and historic battle site and burial ground; and Quitobaquito Springs, which is a local water source and the site of an annual salt pilgrimage. For this reason, construction was opposed by many locals, including Representative Raúl Grijalva and Tohono O’odham Nation Chairman Ned Norris, Jr., who testified before Congress on the matter. Customs and Border Protection officials maintained that no human remains or artifacts were discovered in the areas where explosives were used, and that Monument Hill was previously disturbed in 2010 when the existing border fence was installed.

Climate
Organ Pipe Cactus National Monument has a hot desert climate (Köppen: BWh) with very hot summers and mild winters.

Gallery

See also
 List of national monuments of the United States
 Bates Well Ranch, listed on the National Register of Historic Places within the park
 Dos Lomitas Ranch, also listed on the NRHP
 Growler Valley and Growler Mountains geographic features located within the park
 El Camino del Diablo historic road that traverses a section of the monument

References

External links

 Official Organ Pipe Cactus National Monument website – U.S. National Park Service

 
1937 establishments in Arizona
Articles containing video clips
Mexico–United States border
Parks in Arizona
Protected areas established in 1937
Protected areas of Pima County, Arizona
Protected areas of the Sonoran Desert
National Park Service National Monuments in Arizona